Ponte Buggianese is a comune (municipality) in the Province of Pistoia in the Italian region Tuscany, located about  west of Florence and about  southwest of Pistoia.   

Ponte Buggianese borders the following municipalities: Buggiano, Chiesina Uzzanese, Fucecchio, Larciano, Montecatini Terme, Monsummano Terme, Pieve a Nievole and Uzzano.

References

Cities and towns in Tuscany